Don Ellis Live at Montreux is a live album by trumpeter/bandleader Don Ellis recorded in 1977 and released on the Atlantic label.

Reception

Scott Yanow of Allmusic said "Don Ellis' final record as a leader (he died from a bad heart in December 1978) is a worthwhile effort. Ellis' large orchestra (four reeds, eight brass, one keyboard, two bassists, two drummers, two percussionists and a string quartet) performs six of the leader's originals and, although none of the songs are all that memorable, there are many fine solos". On All About Jazz, Jim Santella observed "this album from the Don Ellis library contains all the rhythmic and polyphonic excitement that you’d expect from such a pioneer in modern big band jazz. ...the album has a significant place in the history of jazz. Ellis influenced many. His legacy continues to inspire"

Track listing 
All compositions by Don Ellis
 "Open Wide" - 9:40		
 "Loneliness" - 5:54		
 "Future Feature" - 7:18		
 "Go No Go" - 5:10		
 "Sporting Dance" - 8:45		
 "Niner Two" - 11:59
 "Lyra" - 8.32 Bonus track on CD reissue
 "Eros" - 5:39 Bonus track on CD reissue
 "Arcturus" - 10:49 Bonus track on CD reissue

Personnel 
Don Ellis - quartertone trumpet, firebird trumpet, flugelhorn, superbone, arranger
Ann Patterson – alto saxophone,  soprano saxophone, oboe, piccolo, alto flute
Ted Nash - alto saxophone, flute, clarinet
James Coile - tenor saxophone, clarinet, flute
Jim Snodgrass - baritone saxophone, bass clarinet, piccolo, flute, oboe
Glenn Stuart, Gil Rathel, Jack Coan – trumpet
Sidney Muldrew – French Horn
Alan Kaplan – trombone
Richard Bullock – bass trombone
Jim Self – tuba
Randy Kerber – keyboards
Darrel Clayborn - double bass
Leon Gaer - electric bass
Dave Crigger, Mike Englander - drums
Ruth Richie - percussion, timpani
Chino Valdes - congas, bongos
Pam Tompkins, Lori Badessa - violin
Jimbo Ross - viola
Paula Hochhalter - cello

References 

Don Ellis live albums
1978 live albums
Albums recorded at the Montreux Jazz Festival
Atlantic Records live albums